Chrysothlypis is a small genus of tanagers found in humid forests of southern Central America and the Chocó in South America. The males of these small birds are strikingly yellow and black or red and white, while the females are much duller.

Taxonomy and species list
The genus Chrysothlypis was introduced in 1912 by the German ornithologist Hans von Berlepsch with the black-and-yellow tanager as the type species. The name combines the Ancient Greek khrusos meaning "gold" with thlupis, an unknown bird.

The genus contains two species:

References

 
Bird genera
Taxa named by Hans von Berlepsch